Operation Roller Coaster was a series of four nuclear tests conducted jointly by the United States and the United Kingdom in 1963, at the Nevada Test Site. The tests did not involve the detonation of any nuclear weapons. Instead, their purpose was to evaluate the distribution of radioactive particles in a "dirty bomb" scenario, or an inadvertent, non-nuclear detonation of a nuclear weapon, as well as to evaluate the effectiveness of storage structures in containing the explosion and the particles released. The tests followed the Operation Storax series and preceded the Operation Niblick series.

References

Explosions in 1963
1963 in military history
1963 in Nevada
1963 in the United Kingdom
May 1963 events in the United States
June 1963 events in the United States
Roller Coaster
British nuclear weapons testing